SCA Group (Social Care in Action) is a social enterprise health and social care organisation based in Southampton, Hampshire, England. It operates in the south coast region of England.

SCA Group started out as SCA Community Care Services (now SCA Care) to provide homecare and day care services. It was established in 1991 on a not-for-profit basis by the Reverend Brian Strevens, former Director of Southampton Council for Voluntary Services.

Projects
SCA Group has established a number of centres and groups that provide services to Southampton residents:
 SCA Support Services (now SCA Transport) provides accessible transport services.
 The Quinn Centre provides National Vocational Qualifications and other training courses for carers in response to a shortage of training within Southampton.
 SCA Trafalgar Dental Services has seven dental practices providing access to NHS dentistry to residents of Hampshire and Dorset.
 SCA Group set up the Fenwick2 Health and Wellbeing Centre following local opposition to the closure of the Fenwick Cottage Hospital. Hampshire Primary Care Trust donated the hospital buildings to SCA Group and Fenwick2 is now run by SCA Group and the Fenwick League of Friends.
 The group's Institute of Social Enterprise is based at the Fenwick2 Health and Well-being Centre.

References

Social entrepreneurship
Companies based in Southampton
Social care in England
1991 establishments in England
Organizations established in 1991